Liza Snyder (born March 20, 1968) is an American actress. She is known for her television roles, which include Officer Molly Whelan in the ABC (and syndicated) series Sirens, Linda in the NBC sitcom Jesse, Christine Hughes in the CBS sitcom Yes, Dear from 2000 to 2006, and Andi Burns in the CBS sitcom Man with a Plan from 2016 to 2020.

Life and career
Snyder was born in Northampton, Massachusetts. Her father is a professor of theatre at Smith College, and her mother is a singer-songwriter. Her maternal grandparents were five-time Academy Award-winning composer, Johnny Green, and the actress and consumer reporter, Betty Furness. Snyder is a graduate of New York City's Neighborhood Playhouse School of the Theatre where she studied acting under the tutelage of Sanford Meisner.

Snyder began her career appearing in episodes of television dramas such as The Trials of Rosie O'Neill and Murder, She Wrote. In 1993, she landed the leading role of Molly Whelan in the ABC and then syndicated crime drama  Sirens. After the series was canceled, she co-starred in two made-for-television movies, and guest starred on Chicago Hope, and Pacific Blue. From 1998 to 2000, she was regular cast member in the NBC sitcom Jesse starring Christina Applegate. She made her big screen debut in a secondary role in Pay It Forward directed by Mimi Leder. Later that year, Snyder began starring as Christine Hughes on the CBS sitcom Yes, Dear. The series ended in 2006.

After Yes, Dear, Snyder had a five-year hiatus. In 2011, she returned to television with guest starring role in an episode of House, playing a patient in need of a lung transplant. She reprised her Yes, Dear role in a 2013 episode of Raising Hope. In 2016, Snyder returned to regular series television work starring alongside Matt LeBlanc in the CBS sitcom Man with a Plan.

Filmography

References

External links

1968 births
American film actresses
American television actresses
Living people
People from Northampton, Massachusetts
Actresses from Massachusetts
Neighborhood Playhouse School of the Theatre alumni
21st-century American women